1994 Urawa Red Diamonds season

Review and events

League results summary

League results by round

Competitions

Domestic results

J.League

Suntory series

NICOS series

Emperor's Cup

J.League Cup

Player statistics

 † player(s) joined the team after the opening of this season.

Transfers

In:

Out:

Transfers during the season

In
Masahiro Sukigara (from Verdy Kawasaki on March)
Nobuo Kikuhara (from University of Tsukuba on March)
Tetsuya Asano (loan from Nagoya Grampus Eight on April)
Uwe Bein (from Eintracht Frankfurt on July)
Guido Buchwald (from VfB Stuttgart on July)
Akihisa Sonobe (from Urawa Red Diamonds GK coach)
Takeshi Nakashima (from Waseda University on September)

Out
Kōichi Hashiratani (to Kashiwa Reysol on June)
Miro (on September)

Awards
none

Notes

References

Other pages
 J. League official site
 Urawa Red Diamonds official site

Urawa Red Diamonds
Urawa Red Diamonds seasons